The Romanian Cross Country Championships is an annual cross country running organised by the Romanian Athletics Federation that serves as the national championship for the sport in Romania. The scheduling of the event varies – sometimes it is held in late Autumn from October to November, other times in spring from February to April.

After an initial hosting in 1916, it was formally established as an annual event from 1920 onwards. Initially a men's competition only, a women's championship race was introduced in 1947. Bar one interruption in 1961, the races has been contested every year since. Additional short course races over four kilometres were occasionally held at the championships, appearing in 1958 and during the distance's presence at the IAAF World Cross Country Championships from 1998 to 2006 (bar 2001).

The most successful athlete in the men's race, and overall, is Cristea Dinu, who won ten titles in the period from 1935 to 1951. In the women's section, Edith Treybal has the most titles with six, starting with a win in 1948 then having five consecutive wins from 1950–54

Editions

Long race

Short race winners

References

List of winners
National Crosscountry Champions for Romania. Association of Road Racing Statisticians (2017-03-06). Retrieved 2020-07-05.
Romanian Championships. GBR Athletics. Retrieved 2020-07-05.

External links
Romanian Athletics Federation website

National cross country running competitions
Athletics competitions in Romania
Annual sporting events in Romania
Recurring sporting events established in 1916
1916 establishments in the Netherlands
Cross country running in Romania